Citrus australasica, the Australian finger lime or caviar lime, is a thorny understorey shrub or small tree of lowland subtropical rainforest and rainforest in the coastal border region of Queensland and New South Wales, Australia.

It has edible fruits which are under development as a commercially sold crop.

Description 

Cultivation and uses

History 
Early settlers consumed the fruit and retained the trees when clearing for agriculture. Colonial botanists suggested that they should be cultivated, due to the lack of citrus alternatives.

Rising demand 

The finger lime has been recently popularised as a gourmet bushfood. The globular juice vesicles (also known as pearls) have been likened to a "lime caviar", which can be used as a garnish or added to various recipes. The fresh vesicles have the effect of a burst of effervescent tangy flavour as they are chewed. The fruit juice is acidic and similar to that of a lime. Marmalade and pickles are also made from finger lime. Finger lime peel can be dried and used as a flavouring spice.

Commercial use of finger lime fruit started in the mid-1990s with boutique marmalades made from wild harvested fruit. By 2000 the finger lime was being sold in restaurants, and exported fresh.

The finger lime has been recently grown on a commercial basis in Australia in response to high demand for the fruit. There is an increasing range of genetic selections which are budded onto citrus rootstock. With the sudden high market demand for the fruit the primary source of genetic material for propagation has been selections from wild stock.

Diseases 

In cultivation, the finger lime plant is grown in much the same way as other citrus species. It may be subject to some pests and diseases requiring pest control in cropping situations. This includes scale, caterpillars, gall-wasp, and limb dieback. Fruit fly research has concluded that finger limes are a non-host plant to fruit flies and as such are not a quarantine risk to importing countries.

Research conducted since the 1970s indicated that a wild selection of C. australasica was highly resistant to Phytophthora citrophthora root disease, which has resulted in a cross-breeding program with finger lime to develop disease-resistant citrus rootstock. In 2020, researchers began working with C. australasica to develop solutions for Citrus greening disease.

The CSIRO has also developed several Citrus hybrids by crossing the finger lime with standard Citrus species. These hybrids have created many cultivars  which generate finger limes in many different colors ranging from light pink to deep blue-green.  Finger lime is thought to have the widest range of color variation within any Citrus species.  The color of the pulp (juice vesicles) comes in shades of green or pink including pale lime-green, pale pink, coral, and scarlet.

Taxonomy 
Historically the finger lime was viewed as a member of the genus Citrus. The Swingle system of taxonomy instead divided the historical true citrus into seven genera, placing the finger lime along with the round lime in a novel genus, Microcitrus. However, subsequent studies have favored a broader concept of Citrus that reunites the genera separated by Swingle, restoring the finger lime to Citrus.

References

External links 
 
 
 

Australian Aboriginal bushcraft
Australian cuisine
Bushfood
australasica
Crops originating from Australia
Edible fruits
Flora of New South Wales
Flora of Queensland
australasica
Plants described in 1858
Sapindales of Australia
Taxa named by Ferdinand von Mueller